Lashkendar is a mountain in Abkhazia. The mountain is one of the seven shrines of the Abkhaz people. There are also ruins of a Christian temple on one of its lesser summits featuring bas-reliefs of leopards (or possibly dogs). The date of its construction is disputed with estimates ranging from 7th to 11th century.

Etymology
Lashkendari or Lashqendari is a Megrelian word and means shaded or north side shkendi/shqerdi/shqedi - north side of a hill, shaded place, north side.

References

 Верещагин Сергей. Абхазия. (Sergey Vereshchagin. Abkhazia) 2004 - 2005.

Mountains of Abkhazia